Nathaniel Felton (May 15, 1615 – July 30, 1705) was a landowner in the Massachusetts Bay Colony. He served as a juryman, grand juryman, constable, Ensign, and Lieutenant. He was the son of John Felton (1585–1627) and Ellen Thrower (1588–1652). His home was among the first built in what is now Peabody, Massachusetts. Together with the home of his son, Nathaniel Felton Jr., the pair of houses became known as the Nathaniel Felton Houses. He is known for his role in the drafting and, along with his wife, being the first to sign a petition in support of John Proctor.

Early life
Nathaniel Felton was born in Great Yarmouth, England. He emigrated from England in 1633 with his mother during the Puritan migration to New England. Nathaniel Felton is considered to be the first ancestor of the "Northern line of Feltons" to arrive in the American colonies, settling in the Massachusetts Bay Colony.

Salem Witch Trials
Nathaniel Felton's name is found on two petitions of support for individuals accused of witchcraft during the Salem witch trials. The first was that of Rebecca Nurse, who was arrested in 1692. His name appears on a list of 39 Salem residents who signed a petition in her defense. Fellow signatory, John Proctor was then also accused of witchcraft.

Subsequently, Nathaniel and several other neighbors drafted and signed a petition in support of John Proctor. The petition proved unsuccessful and John Proctor was executed upon the conclusion of his trial.

References

1615 births
1705 deaths
People of the Salem witch trials
People from Great Yarmouth